T'ula Qullu (Aymara t'ula wood, burning material, qullu mountain, "wood mountain", also spelled Thola Khollu) is a mountain in the Bolivian Andes which reaches a height of approximately . It is located in the Potosí Department, Tomás Frías Province, Potosí Municipality. It lies southwest of Cerro Rico and east of Qutaña Qullu.

References 

Mountains of Potosí Department